Fermi–Dirac statistics (F–D statistics) is a type of quantum statistics that applies to the physics of a system consisting of many non-interacting, identical particles that obey the Pauli exclusion principle. A result is the Fermi–Dirac distribution of particles over energy states. It is named after Enrico Fermi and Paul Dirac, each of whom derived the distribution independently in 1926 (although Fermi derived it before Dirac). Fermi–Dirac statistics is a part of the field of statistical mechanics and uses the principles of quantum mechanics.

F–D statistics applies to identical and indistinguishable particles with half-integer spin (1/2, 3/2, etc.), called fermions, in thermodynamic equilibrium. For the case of negligible interaction between particles, the system can be described in terms of single-particle energy states. A result is the F–D distribution of particles over these states where no two particles can occupy the same state, which has a considerable effect on the properties of the system. F–D statistics is most commonly applied to electrons, a type of fermion with spin 1/2. 

A counterpart to F–D statistics is Bose–Einstein statistics (B–E statistics), which applies to identical and indistinguishable particles with integer spin (0, 1, 2, etc.) called bosons. In classical physics, Maxwell–Boltzmann statistics (M–B statistics) is used to describe particles that are identical and treated as distinguishable. For both B–E and M–B statistics, more than one particle can occupy the same state, unlike F–D statistics.

History
Before the introduction of Fermi–Dirac statistics in 1926, understanding some aspects of electron behavior was difficult due to seemingly contradictory phenomena. For example, the electronic heat capacity of a metal at room temperature seemed to come from 100 times fewer electrons than were in the electric current. It was also difficult to understand why the emission currents generated by applying high electric fields to metals at room temperature were almost independent of temperature.

The difficulty encountered by the Drude model, the electronic theory of metals at that time, was due to considering that electrons were (according to classical statistics theory) all equivalent. In other words, it was believed that each electron contributed to the specific heat an amount on the order of the Boltzmann constant kB.
This problem remained unsolved until the development of F–D statistics.

F–D statistics was first published in 1926 by Enrico Fermi and Paul Dirac. According to Max Born, Pascual Jordan developed in 1925 the same statistics, which he called Pauli statistics, but it was not published in a timely manner. According to Dirac, it was first studied by Fermi, and Dirac called it "Fermi statistics" and the corresponding particles "fermions".

F–D statistics was applied in 1926 by Ralph Fowler to describe the collapse of a star to a white dwarf. In 1927 Arnold Sommerfeld applied it to electrons in metals and developed the free electron model, and in 1928 Fowler and Lothar Nordheim applied it to field electron emission from metals. Fermi–Dirac statistics continues to be an important part of physics.

Fermi–Dirac distribution
For a system of identical fermions in thermodynamic equilibrium, the average number of fermions in a single-particle state  is given by the Fermi–Dirac (F–D) distribution, 

The distribution is normalized by the condition 

 

that can be used to express  in that  can assume either a positive or negative value.

At zero absolute temperature,  is equal to the Fermi energy plus the potential energy per fermion, provided it is in a neighbourhood of positive spectral density. In the case of a spectral gap, such as for electrons in a semiconductor, the point of symmetry, is typically called the Fermi level or—for electrons—the electrochemical potential, and will be located in the middle of the gap.

Since the F–D distribution was derived using the Pauli exclusion principle, which allows at most one fermion to occupy each possible state, a result is that  .

Distribution of particles over energy

From the Fermi–Dirac distribution of particles over states, one can find the distribution of particles over energy. The average number of fermions with energy  can be found by multiplying the F–D distribution  by the degeneracy  (i.e. the number of states with energy ),

When , it is possible that , since there is more than one state that can be occupied by fermions with the same energy .

When a quasi-continuum of energies  has an associated density of states  (i.e. the number of states per unit energy range per unit volume), the average number of fermions per unit energy range per unit volume is

where  is called the Fermi function and is the same function that is used for the F–D distribution ,

so that

Quantum and classical regimes
The Fermi–Dirac distribution approaches the Maxwell–Boltzmann distribution in the limit of high temperature and low particle density, without the need for any ad hoc assumptions:

 In the limit of low particle density, therefore  or equivalently . In that case, which is the result from Maxwell-Boltzmann statistics.
 In the limit of high temperature, the particles are distributed over a large range of energy values, therefore the occupancy on each state (especially the high energy ones with ) is again very small, . This again reduces to Maxwell-Boltzmann statistics.

The classical regime, where Maxwell–Boltzmann statistics can be used as an approximation to Fermi–Dirac statistics, is found by considering the situation that is far from the limit imposed by the Heisenberg uncertainty principle for a particle's position and momentum. For example, in physics of semiconductor, when the density of states of conduction band is much higher than the doping concentration, the energy gap between conduction band and fermi level could be calculated using Maxwell-Boltzmann statistics. Otherwise, if the doping concentration is not negligible compared to density of states of conduction band, the F–D distribution should be used instead for accurate calculation. It can then be shown that the classical situation prevails when the concentration of particles corresponds to an average interparticle separation  that is much greater than the average de Broglie wavelength  of the particles:

For the case of conduction electrons in a typical metal at  = 300 K (i.e. approximately room temperature), the system is far from the classical regime because  . This is due to the small mass of the electron and the high concentration (i.e. small ) of conduction electrons in the metal. Thus Fermi–Dirac statistics is needed for conduction electrons in a typical metal.

Another example of a system that is not in the classical regime is the system that consists of the electrons of a star that has collapsed to a white dwarf. Although the temperature of white dwarf is high (typically  =  on its surface), its high electron concentration and the small mass of each electron precludes using a classical approximation, and again Fermi–Dirac statistics is required.

Derivations

Grand canonical ensemble

The Fermi–Dirac distribution, which applies only to a quantum system of non-interacting fermions, is easily derived from the grand canonical ensemble. In this ensemble, the system is able to exchange energy and exchange particles with a reservoir (temperature T and chemical potential μ fixed by the reservoir).

Due to the non-interacting quality, each available single-particle level (with energy level ϵ) forms a separate thermodynamic system in contact with the reservoir.
In other words, each single-particle level is a separate, tiny grand canonical ensemble.
By the Pauli exclusion principle, there are only two possible microstates for the single-particle level: no particle (energy E = 0), or one particle (energy E = ε). The resulting partition function for that single-particle level therefore has just two terms:

and the average particle number for that single-particle level substate is given by

This result applies for each single-particle level, and thus gives the Fermi–Dirac distribution for the entire state of the system.

The variance in particle number (due to thermal fluctuations) may also be derived (the particle number has a simple Bernoulli distribution):

Canonical ensemble

It is also possible to derive Fermi–Dirac statistics in the canonical ensemble. Consider a many-particle system composed of N identical fermions that have negligible mutual interaction and are in thermal equilibrium. Since there is negligible interaction between the fermions, the energy  of a state  of the many-particle system can be expressed as a sum of single-particle energies,

where  is called the occupancy number and is the number of particles in the single-particle state  with energy . The summation is over all possible single-particle states .

The probability that the many-particle system is in the state , is given by the normalized canonical distribution,

where , e is called the Boltzmann factor, and the summation is over all possible states  of the many-particle system.   The average value for an occupancy number  is

Note that the state  of the many-particle system can be specified by the particle occupancy of the single-particle states, i.e. by specifying  so that

and the equation for  becomes

Rearranging the summations,

where 

Like the Maxwell–Boltzmann distribution and the Bose–Einstein distribution the Fermi–Dirac distribution can also be derived by the Darwin–Fowler method of mean values (see Müller-Kirsten).

Microcanonical ensemble

A result can be achieved by directly analyzing the multiplicities of the system and using Lagrange multipliers.

Suppose we have a number of energy levels, labeled by index i, each level
having energy εi  and containing a total of ni  particles. Suppose each level contains gi  distinct sublevels, all of which have the same energy, and which are distinguishable. For example, two particles may have different momenta (i.e. their momenta may be along different directions), in which case they are distinguishable from each other, yet they can still have the same energy. The value of gi  associated with level i is called the "degeneracy" of that energy level. The Pauli exclusion principle states that only one fermion can occupy any such sublevel.

The number of ways of distributing ni indistinguishable particles among the gi sublevels of an energy level, with a maximum of one particle per sublevel, is given by the binomial coefficient, using its combinatorial interpretation

For example, distributing two particles in three sublevels will give population numbers of 110, 101, or 011 for a total of three ways which equals 3!/(2!1!).

The number of ways that a set of occupation numbers ni can be realized is the product of the ways that each individual energy level can be populated:

Following the same procedure used in deriving the Maxwell–Boltzmann statistics,
we wish to find the set of ni for which W is maximized, subject to the constraint that there be a fixed number of particles, and a fixed energy. We constrain our solution using Lagrange multipliers forming the function:

Using Stirling's approximation for the factorials, taking the derivative with respect to ni, setting the result to zero, and solving for ni yields the Fermi–Dirac population numbers:

See also

 Grand canonical ensemble
 Pauli exclusion principle
 Complete Fermi-Dirac integral
 Fermi level
 Fermi gas
 Maxwell–Boltzmann statistics
 Bose–Einstein statistics
 Parastatistics
 Logistic function

Notes

References

Further reading
 
 
 

 
Statistical mechanics